The Horrible Secret of Monhegan Island is a 1984 role-playing game adventure for Call of Cthulhu, written by Gary Pilkington, cover art by Martin Kealey, and published by Grenadier Models.

Contents
The Horrible Secret of Monhegan Island is a module that contains two adventures, "The Horrible Secret of Monhegan Island" and "The House in the Woods".

Reception
Stephen Kyle reviewed The Horrible Secret of Monhegan Island for White Dwarf #59, giving it an overall rating of 7 out of 10, and stated that "Bearing in mind the comparatively cheap price of this book, it presents a very useful package, though still not a patch on the outstanding Curse of the Cthonians ... Zero SAN here I come!"

Matthew J. Costello reviewed The Horrible Secret of Monhegan Island in Space Gamer No. 73. Costello commented that "This module is not nearly as complex as many of the Cthulhu scenarios available, yet it has its share of surprises and horror.  Think of this one as a chilling 'B' movie from the fifties. While it lacks some polish, it's an interesting debut for Grenadier."

Reviews
Different Worlds #40 (July/Aug., 1985)

References

Call of Cthulhu (role-playing game) adventures
Role-playing game supplements introduced in 1984